Paul Dijoud (born 25 June 1938) is an ex-minister of state for Monaco. He was in office from 1994–1997. 

Dijoud was born in Neuilly-sur-Seine.  He served as French ambassador to Colombia (1988–1991), Mexico (1992–1994) and Argentina (1997–2003).

References

1938 births
Living people
Ambassadors of France to Colombia
Ambassadors of France to Mexico
Ambassadors of France to Argentina
People from Neuilly-sur-Seine
Independent Republicans politicians
Republican Party (France) politicians
Union for French Democracy politicians
Ministers of State of Monaco
French Ministers of the Environment